

Hide or hides may refer to:

Common uses
 Hide (skin), the cured skin of an animal
 Bird hide, a structure for observing birds and other wildlife without causing disturbance
 Gamekeeper's hide or hunting hide or hunting blind, a structure to hide in when viewing or hunting wildlife
 Hide (unit), a unit of land area or land-based tax assessment used in early medieval England
 Hide-and-seek, the children's game
 A lair, a structure or object for animals to hide within, in some cases necessary to that animal's habit/lifestyle

People
 Hide (surname)
 Hide (musician) (1964–1998), musician from the band X Japan
 , Japanese politician
 Hidehiko Hoshino (born 1966), musician from the band Buck-Tick
 , Japanese painter
 , Japanese multifaceted career in professional baseball
 , Japanese analytic philosopher 
 , Japanese discus thrower
 , Japanese professional footballer

Film and TV
 The Hide, a 2008 thriller film based on the stage play The Sociable Plover by Tim Whitnall
 Hide (film), a 2008 action film starring Rachel Miner
 Hide (2011 film), a 2011 television film by John Gray (director)
 "Hide" (Doctor Who), 2013 episode

Music
 Hide album by The Bloody Beetroots 2013
 Hide (album), a 2010 album by experimental band Foetus

Songs
 "Hide" (Creed song), a 2002 song from the album Weathered by Creed
 "Hide" (Joy Williams song), from the album Genesis
 "Hide", a song by Dinosaur Jr. from their 1993 album Where You Been
 "Hide", a song by Scott Grimes from his 2010 album Drive
 "Hide", a song by Ty Herndon from his 2005 album Right About Now

Other uses
 Hides gas field, Papua New Guinea

See also
 Hyde (disambiguation)
 Rawhide (disambiguation)
 Hyde (surname)

Japanese masculine given names
Japanese unisex given names